PayActiv is a financial services company headquartered in San Jose, California. PayActiv partners with companies to provide employees with financial services such as earned wage access.

Services 
To receive a cash advance for their unpaid wages in the current pay period, employees pay a $5 fee. The company links with payroll providers such as ADP, Paychex and Kronos Incorporated to provide early access wages to employees. The service is mostly used by companies with lower income employees who work to paycheck-to-paycheck.

Criticism 
In October 2020, the New York Times noted that the $5 fee PayActiv charges could be equivalent to over a 365% APR which is comparable to the rates charged by some payday lenders.

History 
PayActiv was founded in 2012 by Safwan Shah, Sohail Aslam, and Ijaz Anwar. In 2014, the company raised $4.3 million in funding.

In 2017, Walmart introduced salary advances through PayActiv. As of 2019, an estimated 380,000 of Walmart's 1.4 million employees used the app regularly.

In 2019, the company processed $2.5 billion in early wage payments. That year, the company announced a partnership with Visa that would allow users to receive and spend paycheck advances through a prepaid Visa card.

In 2019, PayActiv sponsored California Senate Bill 472, which would create a regulatory framework for earned wage access (EWA) providers in California. The bill limited the transaction fees and the number of transactions that EWA programs could provide.

In January 2020, David Reldy was appointed as the company's first Chief Legal Officer. PayActiv partnered with OnShift in March 2020 to provide early wage access to workers in healthcare and rehabilitation facilities during the COVID-19 pandemic. In August, 2020 PayActiv raised $100 million in Series C funding, led by Eldridge Industries.

In December 2020, the Consumer Financial Protection Bureau (CPFB) granted PayActiv sandbox approval to provide Early Wage Access (EWA). The CFPB ruled that PayActiv was not a traditional lender since its EWA program did not create debt, and as such was exempt from the Truth in Lending Act.

As of 2021, the company had partnered with 1,500 employers, including Walmart, Wendy's, and Pizza Hut. In March 2021, PayActiv partnered with Hancock Whitney to offer earned wage access to bank clients.

References 

Financial services companies based in California
Financial technology companies
Financial services companies established in 2012
Payday loan companies